Arendonk is a municipality located in the Belgian province of Antwerp. The municipality comprises only the town of Arendonk proper. In 2021, Arendonk had a total population of 13,207. The total area is 55.38 km².

The spoken language is Kempenlands (an East Brabantian dialect, which is very similar to colloquial Dutch).

Nickname
The nickname for a person living in Arendonk is "Telowerelè'er" meaning dish-licker. A statue personating the nickname is located in proximity of the Toremansmolen windmill, another attraction. The mill is still operational and can be visited regularly. The mayor of this city is called Kristof Hendrickx.

Famous inhabitants
 Rik Van Steenbergen, thrice World Cycling Champion
 René Mertens, cyclist in the 1948 Tour de France
 Karel Meulemans, one of the best pigeonfanciers worldwide
 Janssen Brothers of Schoolstraat, Arendonk - The most famous pigeon fanciers in the World.
 There is a possibility that the flemish painter Jan van Eyck is originally from Arendonk.

Image gallery

Climate

See also
 Ravago

References

External links

Official website - Available only in Dutch

 
Municipalities of Antwerp Province
Populated places in Antwerp Province